Late Night Tales: Röyksopp is a mix album compiled by Norwegian electronic music duo Röyksopp. It was released on 14 June 2013 as part of the Late Night Tales series. The mix includes tracks from artists such as Vangelis, XTC, F. R. David, Tuxedomoon and Thomas Dolby. It also features an exclusive new Röyksopp track titled "Daddy's Groove" and the studio version of their cover of Depeche Mode's song "Ice Machine".

Critical reception

Late Night Tales: Röyksopp received critical acclaim from music critics. At Metacritic, which assigns a normalised rating out of 100 to reviews from mainstream publications, the album received an average score of 75, based on 4 reviews, indicating "generally favorable reviews".

Jason Lymangrover of AllMusic commented that "Röyksopp's contribution [to the Late Night Tales series] showcases the Norwegian duo's love of analog synthesizer tones. The album's 19 tracks weave an icy, cinematic narrative". Roy Søbstad of Fædrelandsvennen noted that "The selection [of songs] is as catchy as it is eclectic, and is equally suitable for both after parties and music nerds." Ned Raggett of Pitchfork stated that "There's a sweetly consistent mood throughout [the album]; it’s something you can put on and treat as ambient sound, but there’s also a clever subtlety in their process."

Track listing

Personnel
Credits adapted from the liner notes of Late Night Tales: Röyksopp.

 Röyksopp – DJ mix
 Peter Ashworth – cover photography
 Paul Morris – mastering
 The Reptile House – design

Release history

Charts

References

External links
 Official Röyksopp website
 Official Late Night Tales: Röyksopp page

2013 compilation albums
Royksopp
Röyksopp albums